Fareed Ebrahim Fareed (Arabic:فريد إبراهيم فريد) (born 1 March 1998) is a Qatari born-Egyptian footballer who plays for Umm Salal as a winger.

Career
Fareed Ebrahim started his career at Al Ahli and is a product of the Al-Ahli's youth system. On 30 September 2017, Fareed Ebrahim made his professional debut for Al-Ahli against Umm Salal in the Pro League, replacing Abdulla Afifa.

External links

References

Living people
1998 births
Qatari footballers
Qatari people of Egyptian descent
Naturalised citizens of Qatar
Al Ahli SC (Doha) players
Al-Wakrah SC players
Al Kharaitiyat SC players
Al Bidda SC players
Umm Salal SC players
Qatar Stars League players
Qatari Second Division players
Association football wingers
Place of birth missing (living people)